Abdal Beg Talish, also known as Dada Beg Talish, was a Qizilbash leader (emir) of Talysh origin, who served the Safaviyya order, and later the dynasty established by the order, the Safavid dynasty. The date of his death is unknown; he disappears from mention after 1513.

See also 
 Khadem Beg Talish

References

Sources 

 
 
 
 
 

Safavid generals
15th-century Iranian military personnel
16th-century Iranian military personnel
16th-century deaths
15th-century births
Talysh people
Qurchi-bashi
16th-century people of Safavid Iran